Ralph S. Muckenfuss (born c. 1916) served as the first director of The Public Health Research Institute of The City of New York; he left temporarily during World War II "to take up important duties with the American armed forces."

Career
"Beginning in about 1929" Muckenfuss was a Missouri hospital's lab director. 

In 1935, he accepted an invitation from New York City's 
Department of Health to become its
"temporary assistant director of the city's Bureau of Laboratories."
 The New York Times wrote that it was a "Job Local Doctors Refused", and Muckenfuss had a position as a bacteriologist of Washington University in St. Louis. By 1947, he had become director. By 1953, he had moved to the
parent body, and his title was "assistant commissioner of the Health Department."
 He stayed on during the 1960s but never became commissioner.

When New York City had a smallpox crisis in 1947, Muckenfuss "telephoned officials of three drug companies in their homes over the weekend and asked them to start maximum production", and the mayor entrusted him with managing the situation.

References

20th-century American physicians
1910s births
Year of birth uncertain
Year of death missing
Washington University School of Medicine faculty